This is a timeline of women's suffrage in Colorado. Women's suffrage efforts started in the late 1860s. During the state constitutional convention for Colorado, women received a small win when they were granted the right to vote in school board elections. In 1877, the first women's suffrage referendum was defeated. In 1893, another referendum was successful. After winning the right to vote, Colorado women continued to fight for a federal women's suffrage amendment. While most women were able to vote, it wasn't until 1970 that Native Americans living on reservations were enfranchised.

19th century

1860s 

1868

 John Evans and D. M. Richards worked to include women's suffrage as an issue in the territorial legislature.

1870s 
1870

 January 3: The territorial governor, Edward M. McCook, addresses the legislature where he supports women's suffrage.
1876

 January 10: Women's suffrage convention is held at the Unity Church in Denver.
February 15: The state Constitutional Convention delegates hear arguments on women's suffrage. Women's suffrage is defeated by a vote of 24 to 8, but a provision of the constitution allows later suffrage referendums.
1877

 February 15: The Woman Suffrage Association holds their annual convention. 
August 15: A mass meeting to organize a women's suffrage campaign took place in Denver. 
September 11: Susan B. Anthony arrives in Granada to give a women's suffrage speech. 
October 1: Another mass meeting is held in Denver. Speakers include Lucy Stone and Margaret W. Campbell. 
1879

 Women's rights newspaper, The Colorado Antelope, is founded by Caroline Nichols Churchill.

1800s 
1881

 The Colorado Equal Association is organized.
A bill to grant municipal suffrage to women fails in the General Assembly.

1890s 
1891

 The General Assembly receives a women's suffrage petition.

1893

 January 24: Women's suffrage bill comes out of committee and goes to the state House.
March 8: Women's suffrage bill is voted on again in the House and passed 34 to 27.
April 3: The bill passes in the state Senate, 20 to 10.
September 4: Carrie Chapman Catt comes to Colorado for a series of lectures and to help organize suffrage groups.
November 7: The referendum on women's suffrage takes place and suffragists win the right to vote in all elections in Colorado.

20th century

1910s 
1914

 The Congressional Union opens  their headquarters in Denver.

1916

 April 15: The Suffrage Special arrives in Denver.
 April 17: The Suffrage Special arrives in Colorado Springs.
August: The National Woman's Party holds a convention in Colorado Springs at the Hotel Antlers.

1919

 December 8: A special session of the Colorado General Assembly is called.
December 15: Colorado ratifies the Nineteenth Amendment.
The Prison Special visits Denver.

1920s 
1920

 June 17: The State Equal Suffrage Association dissolves and becomes the League of Women Voters of Colorado.
1924

 The Indian Citizenship Act gives Native Americans U.S. citizenship, but Colorado will not allow them to vote.

1970s 
1970

 Native Americans living on reservations are finally allowed to vote in Colorado.

See also 

 List of Colorado suffragists
 Women's suffrage in Colorado
 Women's suffrage in states of the United States
 Women's suffrage in the United States

References

Sources 

 

Colorado suffrage
Politics of Colorado
Timelines of states of the United States
Suffrage referendums
American suffragists
History of women's rights in the United States
History of women in Colorado